The Western Forest Complex, straddling two countries, Thailand and Myanmar, including 19 national parks and wildlife sanctuaries, is the main biodiversity conservation corridor of the region. Covering 18,730 km2, it is one of the largest protected territories in Southeast Asia. The geography of the Western Forest Complex ranges from lowlands to the mountains of the Thai highlands and the Dawna-Tenasserim Hills.

Because of its large size, it supports diverse large mammal fauna, including Indochinese tiger, Indochinese leopard, dhole, clouded leopard, sun bear, 10 species of primates (all five of the region’s macaques), gaur, banteng, water buffalo, elephant, tapir, and four of Thailand's five deer species. Altogether 153 mammal species, 490 bird species, 41 reptiles, and 108 species of fish are confirmed in the area.

Protected areas

In Myanmar
Tanintharyi Nature Reserve

In Thailand
Salakphra Wildlife Sanctuary
Huai Kha Khaeng Wildlife Sanctuary
Thung Yai Naresuan (West and East) Wildlife Sanctuary
Khao Sanampriang Wildlife Sanctuary
Um Phang Wildlife Sanctuary
Erawan National Park
Chaloem Rattanakosin National Park
Sai Yok National Park
Si Nakharin National Park
Khlong Lan National Park
Mae Wong National Park
Phu Toei National Park
Khlong Wang Chao National Park
Khao Laem National Park
Thong Pha Phum National Park
Lam Khlong Ngu National Park
Mae Nam Phachi Wildlife Sanctuary
Kaeng Krachan National Park

References

External links
Western Forest Complex
Description of Wildlife Sanctuaries Thung Yai Naresuan and Huai Kha Khaeng
Mongabay: camera trap footage of a list of species in the area

Nature conservation in Thailand
Parks in Myanmar